Eugène Montel (5 June 1885 - 21 January 1966) was a French politician.

Life
Born in Montbazin into a Protestant family, he represented the French Section of the Workers' International (SFIO) in the National Assembly from 1951 to 1966. He was the mayor of Colomiers from 1944 to 1966 and was President of the Conseil général de la Haute-Garonne from 1947 until his death in 1966.

References

1885 births
1966 deaths
People from Hérault
French Protestants
Mayors of places in Occitania (administrative region)
French Section of the Workers' International politicians
Deputies of the 2nd National Assembly of the French Fourth Republic
Deputies of the 3rd National Assembly of the French Fourth Republic
Deputies of the 1st National Assembly of the French Fifth Republic
Deputies of the 2nd National Assembly of the French Fifth Republic